Daikan is the eighth album from German ambient music producer Thomas Köner. It contains one hour-long track recorded at the 2000 European Media Arts Festival in Osnabrück, Germany.
"Daikan" means "coldest" in Japanese.
Catalogue number: MP 107 CD.

Track listing
"Daikan" - 54:59

References 

2002 albums
Thomas Köner albums
Albums produced by Thomas Köner